Assyrtiko or Asyrtiko is a white Greek wine grape indigenous to the island of Santorini. Assyrtiko is widely planted in the arid volcanic-ash-rich soil of Santorini and other Aegean islands, such as Paros. It is also found on other scattered regions of Greece such as Chalkidiki. Assyrtiko is also being grown by Jim Barry Wines in Clare Valley, South Australia, at the Abbey of New Clairvaux in Northern California since 2011, and at Kefi Winery in Monroe, North Carolina by a first generation Greek family. The original Assyrtiko cuttings were imported in the USA in 1948 by Harold Olmo, grape breeder at the University of California, Davis, where they were stored until the abbey of New Clairvaux took interest in the early 2000s. 

On Santorini, many old vine plantations (over 70 years of age) of Assyrtiko exist, of which many are non-grafted. These plantations have shown resistance to Phylloxera. As the  only European grape vine known to be resistant to wine blight, there is speculation that the actual source of this resistance may arise from the volcanic ash in which the vines grow, and not from the vine itself.

Wine style
The mineral profile of the grape bodes well for blending and in recent times it has been blended often with Sauvignon blanc, Sémillon and Malagousia. Assyrtiko grapes clusters are large, with transparent yellow-gold skin and juicy flesh. In the volcanic soil of Santorini, there appear to be some unique characteristics that develop in the grape variety, and therefore in the wine. One of these characteristics is that Assyrtiko does not lose its acidity even if it is very ripe. Throughout Greece, the grape is vinified to make a variety of dry and sweet wines, including Vinsanto-like musky and syrup-sweet dessert wines. In Retsina, it is often blended with the less-acidic Savatiano grape.

Synonyms
Assyrtiko is also known under the synonyms Arcytico, Assirtico, Assyrtico, Asurtico, and Asyrtiko.

References

External links
Chief Greek white wine varietals (archived)

Grape varieties of Greece
Dessert wine
White wine grape varieties
Santorini